Clavilispinus is a genus of unmargined rove beetles in the family Staphylinidae. There are about 14 described species in Clavilispinus.

Species
These 14 species belong to the genus Clavilispinus:

 Clavilispinus californicus (LeConte, 1863)
 Clavilispinus cephalotes
 Clavilispinus distinguendus
 Clavilispinus exiguus (Erichson, 1840)
 Clavilispinus guadeloupensis Irmler, 1991
 Clavilispinus jeani Herman, 2001
 Clavilispinus junkii
 Clavilispinus laevicauda
 Clavilispinus leai (Cameron, 1927)
 Clavilispinus politus (Sharp, 1887)
 Clavilispinus prolixus (LeConte, 1877)
 Clavilispinus rufescens (Hatch, 1957)
 Clavilispinus sulcicollis (Coiffait, 1976)
 Clavilispinus vinsoni (Jarrige, 1957)

References

Further reading

 
 
 

Osoriinae
Articles created by Qbugbot